Ekk Thee Sanam  is a 2013 Indian drama film directed by Monish Kaushal and produced by D.R.K and C.R.Parthasarthi under the Harmony Pictures banner. The film was released on 11 October 2013.

Cast
Nisha Triloki
Rajender Thakur
Gopal Thakur

Plot
The film is about a married woman Sanam, being unfaithful to her husband Rajesh. The couple rent out a room and the painter shoots a clip of Sanam bathing, while Rajesh is away at work. He shows it to Sanam who gets angry, but after that she feels aroused and starts having an affair with the painter. The rest of the film is about Rajesh suspecting an affair with Sanam and painter.

Reception
Ekk Thee Sanam received generally negative reviews from critics. The film was one of the worst movie of 2013. Mihir Fadnavis of Firstpost stated, "With great vengeance, I have sifted through the cinematic trash can to collate the worst movies of the year. Because these movies weren’t hand grenades; they were atom bombs whose detonations of dreadfulness created Hiroshima and Nagasaki-sized mushroom clouds in my cerebrum and caused permanent damage to my mental harmony."

References

External links
 

2013 films
2010s Hindi-language films
Indian drama films
Films shot in Mumbai
2013 drama films
Hindi-language drama films